This is a list of people on the postage stamps of Nigeria and earlier constituent parts, including the years in which they appeared on a stamp.

Lagos 1874-1906 
Victoria of the United Kingdom (1874)
Edward VIII of the United Kingdom (1904)

Niger Coast Protectorate 1894-1898 
Victoria of the United Kingdom (1894)

Northern Nigeria 1900-1912 
Victoria of the United Kingdom (1900)
Edward VIII of the United Kingdom (1902)
George V of the United Kingdom (1912)

Oil Rivers 1892-1893 
Victoria of the United Kingdom (1892)

Southern Nigeria 1901-1912 
Victoria of the United Kingdom (1901)
Edward VIII of the United Kingdom (1903)

Nigeria 1914-1960 
Elizabeth II of the United Kingdom (1953–1958)
George V of the United Kingdom (1914–1936)
George VI of the United Kingdom (1937–1948)

Nigeria Independent 1960+ 
Nnamdi Azikiwe (1963, 1964)
Robert Baden-Powell (1965, 1982)
Alexander Graham Bell (1976)
Yakubu Gowon (1969)
Jaja of Opobo (1964)
John F. Kennedy (1964)
Christian J. Kiewiet (1914, 1988)
Herbert Macaulay (1964)
Murtala Muhammed (1977)
Nefertari (1964)
Wright brothers (1978)
Philip Emeagwali (2006)

Biafra 1968-1969 
Pope Paul VI (1969)

See also
Nigerian Postal Service
Postage stamps and postal history of Lagos
Postage stamps and postal history of Nigeria
Postage stamps and postal history of the Niger Coast Protectorate
Postage stamps and postal history of the Niger Territories
Postage stamps and postal history of the Northern Nigeria Protectorate
Postage stamps and postal history of the Oil Rivers Protectorate
Postage stamps and postal history of the Southern Nigeria Protectorate

References

Nigeria, List of people on stamps of
Stamps
Philately of Nigeria
People of stamps